Cudahy Packing Company was an American meat packing company established in 1887 as the Armour-Cudahy Packing Company and incorporated in Maine in 1915. The Cudahy meatpacking business was acquired by Bar-S Foods Company in 1981.

History

In 1887, Michael Cudahy, with the backing of Philip Danforth Armour, started the Armour-Cudahy packing plant in Omaha, Nebraska.

Cudahy Packing Company was created in 1890 when Cudahy bought Armour's interest. The company added branches across the country, including a cleaning products plant at East Chicago, Indiana, built in 1909. In 1911, the company's headquarters were relocated from Omaha to Chicago. 

In 1905, Cudahy Packing Company introduced Old Dutch Cleanser. In 1955, Purex acquired Old Dutch Cleanser from Cudahy. The Greyhound Corporation acquired the consumer products business of Purex (which included Old Dutch Cleanser) in 1985 and was combined with Greyhound's Armour-Dial division, forming The Dial Corporation. In December 2003, Dial was sold to Henkel for $2.9 billion.

By 1922, Cudahy Packing Company was one of the largest packing houses in the United States with over $200 million in annual sales and 13,000 employees around the country. and operations in South Omaha, Kansas City, Saint Joseph, Sioux City, Wichita, Memphis, East Chicago, Salt Lake City, and Los Angeles, as well as distribution operations in 97 cities.  The business was hit by the Great Depression, but the company still employed about 1,000 Chicago-area residents during the mid-1930s.

Following World War II, it moved its headquarters first to Omaha and then in 1956 to Phoenix, where it took the name Cudahy Company. In 1957, the company was one of 500 companies listed in the first S&P 500.

The company was acquired by General Host in 1968.

The Cudahy meat packing business was sold to management in 1981 and renamed Bar-S Foods Company. Bar-S Foods Company was acquired by the Mexican packer Sigma Alimentos in 2010.

References

Further reading
 Cudahy Packing Co. Encyclopedia of Chicago
 Patrick Cudahy, His Life autobiography (1912)
 History of Cudahy Packing Company and meat packing industry from the Nebraska State Historical Society (RG1605.AM)

Cudahy family
Pork
Defunct companies based in Wisconsin
Milwaukee County, Wisconsin
History of Wisconsin
Defunct companies based in Nebraska
History of Omaha, Nebraska
Meat packing companies based in Omaha, Nebraska
Economy of Nebraska
1969 disestablishments
Meat packers